Yasne is a settlement in Kalmiuske Raion, Donetsk Oblast of eastern Ukraine, at 33.6 km SSW from the centre of Donetsk city, at 4.8 km NW from the centre of Dokuchaievsk.

The settlement was taken under control of pro-Russian forces during the War in Donbass, that started in mid-April 2014.

Demographics
Native language as of the Ukrainian Census of 2001:
Ukrainian 45.12%
Russian 54.88%

References

Kalmiuske Raion